Okheyevo is a rural locality (a village) in Kovarditskoye Rural Settlement, Muromsky District, Vladimir Oblast, Russia. The population was 13 as of 2010.

Geography 
Okheyevo is located on the Kartyn River, 17 km west of Murom (the district's administrative centre) by road. Mikhaylovo is the nearest rural locality.

References 

Rural localities in Muromsky District